The fourth season of the television comedy series Community premiered on February 7, 2013, and concluded on May 9, 2013. The season consists of 13 episodes and aired on NBC on Thursdays at 8:00 pm ET as part of the network's "Comedy Night Done Right" programming block.

The season marked the departure of showrunner Dan Harmon, replaced by Moses Port and David Guarascio, and overall received mixed reviews from critics. In the series's fifth season, Harmon returned as showrunner, and the fourth season was referred to retroactively in the series' continuity as "the gas-leak year."

Cast

Starring
Joel McHale as Jeff Winger
Gillian Jacobs as Britta Perry
Danny Pudi as Abed Nadir
Yvette Nicole Brown as Shirley Bennett
 Alison Brie as Annie Edison
 Donald Glover as Troy Barnes
 Jim Rash as Dean Craig Pelton 
 Ken Jeong as Ben Chang / Kevin 
Chevy Chase as Pierce Hawthorne

Recurring
Richard Erdman as Leonard Briggs 
Erik Charles Nielsen as Garrett Lambert 
Danielle Kaplowitz as Vicki Jenkins
Charley Koontz as Neil 
Luke Youngblood as Magnitude
Malcolm McDowell as Professor Cornwallis 
David Neher as Todd Jacobson

Guest stars
Jason Alexander as Mountain Man ("Intro to Felt Surrogacy")
Sara Bareilles as Balloon Guide ("Intro to Felt Surrogacy")
Jordan Black as City College Dean Spreck ("Heroic Origins")
James Brolin as William Winger, Sr. ("Cooperative Escapism In Familial Relations")
Adam DeVine as William Winger, Jr. ("Cooperative Escapism In Familial Relations")
Chris Diamantopoulos as Reinhold ("Alternative History of the German Invasion")
Joe Lo Truglio as Mark (“Advanced Introduction to Finality”)
Giancarlo Esposito as Gilbert Lawson ("Paranormal Parentage")
Sophie B. Hawkins as herself ("Herstory of Dance")
Tricia Helfer as Lauren ("Conventions of Space and Time")
Brie Larson as Rachel ("Herstory of Dance")
Natasha Leggero as Mysti ("Heroic Origins")
Matt Lucas as Toby Weeks ("Conventions of Space and Time")
Jerry Minor as Jerry the Janitor ("Basic Human Anatomy")
Iqbal Theba as Gobi Nadir ("Heroic Origins")
Fred Willard as Alter-Pierce ("History 101")
Luke Perry as American Inspector Spacetime ("Conventions of Space and Time") (uncredited)
Jennie Garth as the American Inspector Spacetime's ensign/companion ("Conventions of Space and Time") (uncredited)

Episodes

Production

The series was renewed for a fourth season of 13 episodes on May 10, 2012. On May 18, 2012, after returning to California from a cross-country flight, series' creator Dan Harmon received a text message alerting him that he had been relieved of his position as Community showrunner by Sony Pictures Television. Reportedly, Harmon's erratic behavior (such as his drinking, his tardiness, his falling asleep at work and his disappearing in San Francisco for a few days during the SF Sketchfest) and leadership style (namely the “tug of war between his perfectionist tendencies and his procrastinator nature”) were the reasons that the studio fired him. To replace Harmon, Sony Pictures Television hired writers David Guarascio and Moses Port, the co-creators of the short-lived CW series Aliens in America. Sony Pictures Television claimed that Harmon would serve as a consulting producer, but Harmon affirmed via his Tumblr that he would not return in a position without executive prerogatives. Regardless, Harmon was credited as an "executive consultant" for the season, despite not working on a single episode.

The fourth season saw other behind-the-scenes changes, as well. Executive producers Neil Goldman and Garrett Donovan, writer/producer Chris McKenna and actor/writer Dino Stamatopoulos all departed following the third season. Frequent episode directors and executive producers Anthony and Joe Russo also left in order to direct Captain America: The Winter Soldier. McKenna, Stamatopoulos, and Joe Russo later returned to work on the show's fifth season.

Returning writers for fourth season included co-executive producer Andy Bobrow, producer Megan Ganz, and staff writer Tim Saccardo, who had been with the series since season two; and co-executive producer Maggie Bandur, and writing team and executive story editors Steve Basilone and Annie Mebane, who joined the series in season three. New additions to the writing staff in the fourth season included co-executive producer Ben Wexler, co-producers Hunter Covington and Gene Hong, and staff writers Issac Gonzalez and Jack Kukoda. Cast member Jim Rash (who won an Academy Award for co-writing The Descendants) wrote the eleventh episode of the season. Tristram Shapeero, who directed several episodes during the first three seasons, was promoted to an executive producer and directed the majority of the fourth season's episodes.

Filming for the season began in August 2012, and the series was initially scheduled to premiere on October 19, 2012, airing in a new time slot on Fridays at 8:30 pm. In early October 2012, NBC delayed the premiere. NBC.com released a video of the cast of Community in character addressing the delay of the season premiere; this video humorously claimed that October 19 is merely a "state of mind". On October 30, 2012, NBC announced that the fourth season would premiere on February 7, 2013, returning to its original time slot of Thursdays at 8:00 pm.

Chevy Chase's departure

During the filming of "Advanced Documentary Filmmaking", Chevy Chase became angry at the racist direction his character was heading. While venting his frustrations, he used the slur "nigger"; episode director Jay Chandrasekhar argued that Chase's use of the word was a "political comment," and an attempt to point out how racist his character had become. Regardless, the slur upset cast members, and Chase walked off of the set. He later returned to film some additional scenes, but later announced on November 21, 2012, that he had left the show.

As a result of timing and the agreement made, Chase's character Pierce is absent for two episodes—he did not appear in tenth episode, "Intro to Knots", or the twelfth episode, "Heroic Origins". He also appeared in a voice-only role in the episode "Intro to Felt Surrogacy", which was the final episode produced for the season, and as part of his agreement to leave the show, Chase was required to record all audio for the scenes where his character, alongside the other characters, appeared as a puppet. The season finale, which was filmed out-of-sequence, as it was the eleventh episode produced, marked the final on-screen appearance (based on production order) of Chase as a regular cast member.

Reception

Rating

The season premiere, "History 101", was seen by 3.88 million viewers and scored a 1.8 in the 18–49 demographic. This meant that its ratings were up when compared not only to the third season finale (which was seen by 2.48 million viewers and received a 1.3 in the 18–49 demographic), but also the prior season's premiere (which was seen by 3.93 million and received a 1.7 in the 18–49 demographic). The premiere's ratings were enough to generate cautiously optimistic speculation that the show would be renewed for a fifth season (speculation that was later confirmed). However, as the season wore on, the ratings began to dip, which led some to wonder if this would be the show's last season. The season's final episode, "Advanced Introduction to Finality", was viewed by 3.08 million viewers and scored a 1.3 rating in the 18–49 demographic.

Critical reviews
The fourth season received mixed to positive reviews from critics, and is considered to be the weakest season of Community due to Harmon's absence. The fourth season scored 69 out of 100 based on 17 critics on Metacritic based on episode 1 and 3, indicating "generally favorable reviews". On Rotten Tomatoes, the season has an approval rating of 65% with an average score of 6.5 out of 10 based on 40 reviews. The website's critical consensus reads, "Despite some behind-the-scenes drama, the fourth season of Community manages to retain the playful energy, potent humor, and kooky stories the show is famous for."

Verne Gay of Newsday stated, "Still defiantly Community, still good and still uninterested in adding new viewers." On the other hand, Hitfixs Alan Sepinwall stated, "It feels like [Moses] Port, [David] Guarascio and the other writers decided to reverse-engineer the [Dan] Harmon version of Community, but couldn't quite manage without the missing ingredient of Harmon himself." Mike Hale of The New York Times has stated that the series "has been dumbed down, its humor broadened past recognition, and the two episodes provided for review...have fewer laughs between them than a single good scene from the old Community." At the end of season 4, The A.V. Club's Emily VanDerWerff confessed, "I never thought I would say this, but I just don't care anymore."

Harmon's response
In an episode of Harmontown — a weekly live-comedy podcast — Harmon initially said that, while the season was an "impression, and an unflattering one," it was merely "not [his] cup of tea." Later in the same interview, however, he likened it to "'flipping through Instagram just watching your girlfriend blow everyone' and seeing a friend 'Like' a photo of your ex-girlfriend with her new boyfriend on Facebook." Harmon also described the season as like "being held down and watching your family get raped on a beach". Later, in a Tumblr blog post, Harmon apologized to fans of the show, its cast and crew and the writers. He apologized for the rape comparison and for using the phrase "durpy durpy dur" in a joke about the season, saying that the phrase is "language used to dehumanize the developmentally disabled". Sony later expressed an interest in having Harmon record commentary tracks for all the fourth-season episodes, although this did not come to pass.

DVD release

References

External links
 

Community (TV series) seasons
2013 American television seasons